Albert Batsa (born 27 May 1983) is a Togolese football midfielder. He currently plays for Maranatha F.C.

External links
 

1983 births
Living people
Togolese footballers
Liberty Professionals F.C. players
AS Douanes (Togo) players
Maranatha FC players
Association football midfielders
Togo international footballers
21st-century Togolese people